Chemistry Europe (formerly ChemPubSoc Europe) is an organization of 16 chemical societies from 15 European countries, representing over 75,000 chemists. It publishes a family of academic chemistry journals, covering a broad range of disciplines.

Chemistry Europe was founded on the initiative of the German Chemical Society in 1995. The first journal co-owned by Chemistry Europe was Chemistry: A European Journal (launched in 1995). In 1998, the European Journal of Inorganic Chemistry and European Journal of Organic Chemistry were created with the participation of six European chemical societies. Over the years, more societies merged their journals, bringing the total number of societies involved to 16 from 15 different countries (as of 2020).

The Chemistry Europe Fellows Program was established in 2015 (as the ChemPubSoc Europe Fellows Program) and is the highest award given by Chemistry Europe. The Fellowship is awarded based on the recipients' support as authors, advisors, guest editors, referees as well as services to their national chemical societies. New Fellows are announced every two years in the run-up to the biannual EuChemS Congress.

Participating societies
The 16 participating European chemical societies are:

 Gesellschaft Österreichischer Chemiker (GÖCH), Austria
 Société Royale de Chimie (SRC), Belgium
 Koninklijke Vlaamse Chemische Vereniging (KVCV), Belgium
 Česká společnost chemická (ČSCH), Czech Republic
 Société Chimique de France (SCF), France
 Gesellschaft Deutscher Chemiker (GDCh), Germany
 Association of Greek Chemists (EEX), Greece
 Magyar Kémikusok Egyesülete (MKE), Hungary
 Società Chimica Italiana (SCI), Italy
 Koninklijke Nederlandse Chemische Vereniging (KNCV), The Netherlands
 Polskie Towarzystwo Chemiczne (PTChem), Poland
 Sociedade Portuguesa de Química (SPQ), Portugal
Slovenská Chemická Spoloćnosť (SCHS), Slovakia
 Real Sociedad Española de Química (RSEQ), Spain
 Svenska Kemistsamfundet (SK), Sweden
 Schweizerische Chemische Gesellschaft (SCG), Switzerland

Journals

The journals are published by Wiley-VCH and include the titles: Chemistry: A European Journal, European Journal of Organic Chemistry, European Journal of Inorganic Chemistry, Chemistry—Methods, Batteries & Supercaps, ChemBioChem, ChemCatChem, ChemElectroChem, ChemMedChem, ChemPhotoChem, ChemPhysChem, ChemPlusChem, ChemSusChem, ChemSystemsChem, ChemistrySelect, ChemistryOpen, and ChemistryViews online magazine.

References

External links
 

Chemistry societies
1995 establishments in Europe
Organizations established in 1995
Pan-European scientific societies